The Isebania–Kisii–Ahero Road is a road section of the A1 road in Kenya, connecting the towns of Isebania, Migori, Kisii and Ahero.

Location
The road starts at Isebania, Migori County, at the international border with Tanzania.

Overview
This road, is an important trade corridor between Tanzania, Kenya and South Sudan. It links four Kenyan counties and for the residents of these communities, it is a vital trade and transportation link to Kisumu and Nairobi, two of the largest cities in the country. As at April 2016, the road surface has deteriorated and is heavily potholed.

Accidents and Black-spots 
For the traffic that it has, the Kisii-Sirare road is too narrow. In some occasions, overtaking vehicles (particularly buses and trailers) have to get one set of wheels to overlap the road as there is not enough space. Large vehicles also have to slow down when they meet as it is often that one of them, or both of them, will have to get the outside set of wheels off the road. These are factors that have led to many pedestrians and cyclists being hit.

The existence of Sony Sugar Millers at Awendo also means that the public have to share the road with the much slower cane-hauling tractors. Because the tractors usually no lights at the back, and at the front seem deceptively narrow that they would be mistaken for motorbikes, their use of the road at night have led to several accidents, like this one here which led to nine injuries and three deaths. The most common accident spots along the Rongo-Sirare section are Matafari, just after Rongo, and a slope before Kanga from Rongo, near the Olando River. Several trucks and vans have also plunged into the Kuja River near St. Jonathan Primary. In June 2016, a head-on collision between a bus and a track resulted in several deaths and injuries on the bridge. This was the third accident on the same spot in the same year. 

Tales among locals also hold that Nairobi-bound buses are the most carelessly driven vehicles on the road. Bikers and Probox matatus also flout traffic rules, increasing vulnerability to accidents. There have been attempts to make the Kisii-Rongo section safer with a number of speed bumps having been installed.

Schools along the road 
While there are a number of public primary schools that are easily accessible from the road, including the famous Kanga Primary School, public high schools are fewer. The most popular, in this regard, include Itierio Boys Secondary School, Itierio Girls Secondary School, Koderobara Secondary School (2km off the main road at Rongo town), Kanga High School (800 m off the road), Uriri High School, and Isibania Boys High School. There is also Rongo University Town Campus. Private institutions along the road include Mt. Kenya University Kisii Campus (formerly Pace Academy), Kamagambo SDA Schools (Primary, High School, and TTC).

Hospitals accessible from the road 
Hospitals that you can easily access from the road include the Kisii Level V hospital, which is also known as the Kisii Teaching and Referral Hospital (KTRH) RAM hospital at Kisii, Nyangena Hospital at Daraja Mbili, just after Kisii, Tabaka Hospital, five kilometers off Nyachenge town, Lwala Community Center which is located a few kilometers off the Sare-Kamagambo bus stop. In addition to these, there is the Rongo Level IV hospital at Rongo town, Rapcom Medical Center and Awendo Health Center, both at Awendo, and Ombo Mission Hospital.

Major towns 
Major towns along the road include Kisii, Suneka, Rongo, Ranen, Awendo, Migori, Isibania, and Sirare.

Security 
In the recent years past, locals complained of harassment by thieves at night by thieves at Komire. Komire has a small man-made forest on either side of the road that must have provided night cover for the thieves. However, with streetlights being installed along the streets in major towns and in such places, security has improved.

Upgrade and funding
On 30 March 2016, the African Development Bank approved a loan of US$228 million to the Government of Kenya, to apply to the rehabilitation of this road, from 2016 until 2019. Other contributors to the funding of the rehabilitation are illustrated in the table below:

*Note: Totals may be slightly off due to rounding.

See also
 List of roads in Kenya
 East African Community

References

External links
 Webpage of the East African Community
 Chinese firm resumes work on Isebania-Ahero road As of 13 February 2019.

Roads in Kenya
Geography of Kenya
Transport in Kenya
East African Community
Kisii County
Migori County
Homa Bay County
Kisumu County